The 2020 Chinese Athletics Championships was the year's national outdoor track and field championships for China. It was held from 15 to 18 September in Shaoxing.

Results

Men

Women

Mixed

Women

References

Results
Chinese Ch. Shangyu Stadium, Shaoxing (CHN) 15–18 SEP 2020. World Athletics. Retrieved 2021-03-20.

External links
 Chinese Athletics Association official website 

Chinese Athletics Championships
Chinese Athletics Championships
Chinese Athletics Championships
Chinese Athletics Championships
Sport in Zhejiang
Shaoxing